Craig Stuart Gerber (born January 8, 1959) is an American former professional baseball player who played one season for the California Angels of Major League Baseball (MLB). He was a 20th round draft pick in the 1981 Major League Baseball draft. During his 65 games with the Angels he played in the field at shortstop, second and third base. He hit two home runs in a total of 1,662 minor league at bats.

Youth and high school 
Born in Chicago, Illinois, Craig Gerber grew up in San Bernardino, California, where he was a standout in baseball, football, and basketball. He attended San Bernardino's Cajon High School and was the first Cajon graduate to become a professional athlete. A left-hand hitting, right-handed infielder, Gerber was a three-year varsity starter in baseball, being selected to all-state teams twice and leading Cajon to its first-ever baseball state playoff birth in that time. In football, Gerber quarterbacked Cajon's varsity football team for two years. In his senior year, Gerber received an honorable mention in the Joe Namath National Prep Sports Magazine for 1977, and won Cajon's Ken Hubbs Award (with the overall award going to future Professional Football Hall of Fame player Ronnie Lott).

The Cajon baseball program recognizes exceptional infield play with its annual Craig Gerber Award for Best Infielder.

College 
Gerber attended college at California Polytechnic State University, San Luis Obispo, from 1978 to 1981, playing baseball for coach Berdy Harr and serving as team captain his senior year. Gerber was awarded a full four-year athletic scholarship to Cal Poly SLO, and was the only baseball player his freshman year so awarded, with the rest going to junior college transfer players. Gerber's college years included two seasons (1978 and 1979) with the Clarinda (Iowa) A's summer amateur baseball club, and one year (1981) with the Santa Maria (California) Indians semi-pro baseball team.

A flexible multi-position infielder, Gerber took over the position of shortstop his freshman year at Cal Poly SLO from future Baseball Hall of Fame player Ozzie Smith, who graduated in 1977. Near the end of Gerber's senior year, Harr was quoted saying, "[Gerber has] thrown better, hit better and run better than Ozzie did when he was here. I have as much confidence of Craig being a success in the big leagues as I did of Ozzie when he was leaving."

Minor leagues 
Gerber's first stretch in the professional baseball minor leagues included stops in Idaho Falls (Idaho), Redwood City (California), Nashua (New Hampshire), and Edmonton, Alberta (Canada). Gerber's flexibility and dependability in the infield continued to serve notice for major league attention and consideration as he played regularly at second base, third base and shortstop, and even spent time at catcher in Nashua. In Redwood City (1981), Gerber set the league record (23) for double plays by a third baseman in a season, a record that stands as of May, 2021. 
In Edmonton, Gerber was awarded the Rawlings Silver Glove Award for 1984, finishing with the best fielding average (.976) among triple-A shortstops. That same year, however, Gerber's batting was at times inconsistent. At mid-season in Edmonton, when he was hitting just .218, Gerber believed he would need to carry a batting average at least between .280 and .290 to get major league consideration. Edmonton's manager, Moose Stubing, disagreed with Gerber's assessment, calling it "not even close." "If he hits .250, he should get a look. You can carry him with the right club and the right park," Stubing said. Gerber ended the 1984 season with Edmonton with a .230 batting average.

In his 2022 book, "The Book of Joe: Trying Not to Suck at Baseball and Life", Angels organization coach and manager Joe Maddon described an incident that took place in 1981 (when he was managing the Angels single-A affiliate Redwood Pioneers) and involved Maddon, Gerber, and Pioneers shortstop Dick Schofield. According to Maddon's account, a "motorcycle gang" would regularly attend Pioneers home games to heckle players from the first base line fence, and on the first night of the incident the bikers were heckling Schofield for his salary and play performance. In response, Maddon suggested to Schofield that while warming up at shortstop he should overthrow a ball to first base and hit one of the bikers with it. Maddon described Schofield's response by writing, "Schoey is eighteen years old and is the nicest guy in the world and of course he wouldn't do it." On the second night of the incident the bikers were again heckling Schofield, but Maddon had already asked Gerber to make the warm-up overthrow instead, from his position at second base. Though Gerber's throw was short and hit the chain-link fence in front of the bikers, Maddon believed that, "the message was delivered."

California Angels 
Gerber's performance in 1984 earned him a spot in the Angels' spring training camp the following year, aided by the return to the Angels of Manager Gene Mauch and his style of "small ball". Gerber had followed advice from Stubing's assessment the previous year that he become a better bunter, and later described Stubing's work on his hitting saying, "Moose changed me around. He knew I've never struck out a lot [just 29 times in 365 at-bats in 1984] and tried to get me to hit the ball on the ground more. If you keep the ball out of the air, some are going to leak through. That can mean as many as 10-15 hits over 140 games." With Stubing as hitting instructor, Gerber hit .290 in instructional league and .379 in Spring training (a team average exceeded only by veteran Bobby Grich at .481). Of Gerber's offensive skills Mauch said, "Players that have his ability [...] must execute all the things that can win you a game in the late innings. [...] he's not going to walk up there and hit a home run for you. If you can't win a game with a home run, you have to be able to do the little things."

Of Gerber's defensive performance in spring training, Mauch said, "Gerber's a bright kid, someone you could put anywhere and have a good feeling that he'd get the job done. He can play short, second, third, even the outfield. We put him out there in the spring, and he caught everything they hit his way."

Los Angeles Dodgers special assignment scout, Mel Didier, described Gerber and the rest of the group of young rookie players at the 1985 Angels spring training camp by saying, “This is the best crop of young players I’ve ever seen in an Angels’ camp. Five or six of them have a real chance.”

Gerber's major league debut came in Anaheim on April 11, 1985, against the Minnesota Twins. Gerber entered the game as a pinch runner in the bottom of the ninth inning with the Angels losing, 3-1. Gerber scored to tie the game in what would turn out to be a 4-3 Angels win in the tenth inning. Gerber played in 65 games (starting 30) of a full season with the Angels in 1985, finishing with a .264 batting average, a .277 on-base percentage with only three strikeouts in 97 plate appearances, a .319 slugging percentage, and a .971 fielding average playing mostly shortstop and third base, with one game at second base.

Most notable from Gerber's rookie season is his performance against that year's eventual American League Cy Young Award winner, World Series MVP, 20-game winner, and fellow Chicago area native, pitcher Bret Saberhagen of the Kansas City Royals. Over nine plate appearances against Saberhagen, Gerber batted 6-for-8 for a .750 batting average, drove in three runs, and scored twice. A walk and two groundouts accounted for the balance of Gerber's plate appearances against Saberhagen, with no strikeouts. In a post-game interview after batting 3-for-3 with a triple and the three RBIs against Saberhagen, Gerber credited the combination of Saberhagen's ability to throw strikes and his own aggressiveness from only playing sporadically for the performance. Gerber stated, "He threw the ball really hard tonight, and I knew he was going to be around the plate. His statistics are just awesome as far as his strikeout-to-walk ratio and things like that. That's good for me because I'm pretty much up there swinging, because I'm not in there every day."

End of playing career 
Gerber did not return to the Angels in 1986, with speculation on reasons including the return of veteran infielder Rick Burleson from an injury that made him miss the entire 1985 season, and team management's preference for developing younger players. Regarding the Angels not returning Gerber for the 1986 season, local sports columnist Gregg Patton would later write, "The only place anyone has ever beat him out was on a piece of paper in someone's office." Gerber played a limited role at Edmonton in 1986, with a quadriceps injury early in the season contributing to him playing in only 74 games. Despite still being under contract with the Angels organization and fit to play, Gerber did not play at any level for the 1987 season. The Angels kept Gerber on their 40-man roster going into the 1987 season, preventing him from being picked up by another team and allowing the Angels to significantly cut his pay. Gerber asked to be traded or released but the Angels refused (putting Gerber in a position that Patton labeled "infield insurance" for the Angels), and then issued him a suspension notice that would prevent him from playing for any other organization for seven years. Gerber played his final season in baseball in 1988, at AA-level Midland (Texas).

References

External links 

1959 births
Living people
American expatriate baseball players in Canada
Baseball players from Chicago
Cal Poly Mustangs baseball players
California Angels players
Edmonton Trappers players
Idaho Falls Angels players
Major League Baseball infielders
Midland Angels players
Nashua Angels players
Redwood Pioneers players
Spokane Indians players